The Raja Ram Rao Patil or Itbarrao Koli was an Admiral of the Ahmadnagar Navy and Koli ruler of Janjira. Patil built and fortified the Janjira Island.

History 
He was Admiral of  the Ahmadnagar Navy and built the Janjira with permission of Sultan Nizam of Ahmadnagar Sultanate. But later he refused to obey the orders of the Sultan. In 1489, The Ahmadnagar ruler appointed his new admiral called Piram Khan or Bhairam Khan and ordered to capture Janjira from Ramrao Patil. Piram Khan marched from Surat but not dare to attack at Patil so made plans to enter in to janjira. Piram Khan and his Muslim Siddi member disguised as merchants and requested to the Patil for keep their three hundred large boxes containing silk and wine at island safe, and the request was granted. After that, Piram Khan thanked him and gave a him alcohol (wine). When all of the soldiers and Ram Rao Patil were drunk, he attacked at Janjira and captured it from Patil.

References 

Ahmadnagar Sultanate
1489 deaths
Koli people